Tractate Menachot ("Meal Offerings") is the second tractate of the Order of Kodashim. It has Gemara in the Babylonian Talmud and a Tosefta.

Menachot deals with the rules regarding the preparation and presentation of grain-meal and oil and drink offerings, including the meal-offering that was burnt on the altar and the remainder that was consumed by the priests as specified in the Torah ( and on); the bringing of the omer of barley, the two loaves, and the showbread.as offerings in the Temple in Jerusalem.

References

Further reading
 

Jewish animal sacrifice
Land of Israel laws in Judaism
Mishnah
Oral Torah
Second Temple
Tabernacle and Temples in Jerusalem
Talmud